The 2014 São Paulo Challenger de Tênis was a professional tennis tournament played on clay courts. It was the second edition of the tournament which was part of the 2014 ATP Challenger Tour. It took place in São Paulo, Brazil on 14–20 April 2014.

Singles entrants

Seeds

Other entrants
The following players received wildcards into the singles main draw:
  Bruno Sant'Anna
  Flávio Saretta
  Pedro Sakamoto
  Tiago Fernandes

The following players received entry from the qualifying draw:
  Guillermo Durán
  Gabriel Alejandro Hidalgo
  Sherif Sabry
  Nikola Ćirić

Doubles entrants

Seeds

Other entrants
The following pairs received wildcards into the doubles main draw:
  Felipe Carvalho /  Renato Lima
  Pedro Sakamoto /  Joao Pedro Sorgi
  André Ghem /  Flávio Saretta

Champions

Singles

  Rogério Dutra Silva def.  Blaž Rola 6–4, 6–2

Doubles

  Guido Pella /  Diego Sebastián Schwartzman def.  Máximo González /  Andrés Molteni 1–6, 6–3, [10-4]

External links
 Official website

2014 ATP Challenger Tour
Sao Paulo